Zechariah Elefant (Yiddish: זכריהו עלעפאנט, Hebrew: זכריהו אלפנט, Hungarina: Elefánt Zoltan, English: Sol Elefant; February 11, 1886, Kárász, Hungary - June 1957, New York City) was a rabbi, author, publisher, and book salesman.

Biography
Rabbi Zechariah Elefant was born in the town of Kárász, Hungary, to father Rabbi Dov Berish Elefant, and Bava (née Eisenberger). As a young man he studied at the Yeshiva of Sighet and the Pressburg Yeshiva.
 
A few years before the World War I, he married Sarah (née Kahane), a Polish citizen. In 1923, he emigrated to New York with his wife and three children.

In New York, he served as rabbi of a synagogue for a while. Later, he opened a bookstore in Manhattan's Lower East Side, on Canal Street, where he sold "rare manuscripts and published works" as well as Torah scrolls.

In 1938 he published, together with his father, Rabbi Dov Berish Elefant, the book "Ein Habedolach" by Rabbi Chaim Zvi Menheimer, who was his father's teacher. After the death of his father, he published another book, "Ein Habadolach on the Talmud", in 1944.
 
The National Library of Israel holds in its possession two manuscripts with the signature of Rabbi Zechariah Elefant, that originate from his private library.

Some of the books published by the "Zachariah Elefant Publishing Company"
 Responsa Ein HaBedolach - 1938
 Ein HaBedolach : on Talmudic issues - 1944.
Chiddushei HaRan - Tractate Rosh Hashanah - 1945.
Chiddushei HaRan - Tractate Gittin - 1946
 Chidushei HaRan - Tractate Avodah Zarah - 1946.
 Bahinot Olam, translated into English - 1951

References

External links
Ein Habedolach 1944, preface detailing his life's story up to then (in Hebrew).
Sources quoting Rabbi Elefant:
Rabbi Yekutiel Yehuda Grienwald, Kol Bo on Mourning, Vol. 1, New York 1947, p. 380 (in Hebrew).
 Rabbi Yekutiel Yehuda Grienwald, Kol Bo on Mourning, Vol. 2, Brooklyn 1951, p. 147 (in Hebrew).
Dr. Yohanan Cohen-Yashar, "ספר חדש של פרופ׳ נהר על המהר״ל", Hamaayan (Tishrei 5727, 1966),  Vol. 7, Issue 1, p. 78, item 74a (in Hebrew).

1886 births
1957 deaths
People from Baranya County
People from the Kingdom of Hungary
Hungarian Jews